Bonds of Honor is a 1919 American silent film directed by William Worthington. Sessue Hayakawa's Haworth Pictures Corporation produced the film and he himself played the leading roles along with his wife Tsuru Aoki. Marin Sais, Dagmar Godowsky, Herschel Mayall, Toyo Fujita and M. Foshida also appeared in the film.

Plot
Sessue Hayakawa as Yamashito commits treason in WWI to pay off debts from gambling, and his brother Sasamoto also played by Hayakawa assumes his identity to restore the family honor and track him down.

Cast
Sessue Hayakawa as Yamashito / Sasamoto
Marin Sais as Olga Orczy
Tsuru Aoki as Toku-ko
Dagmar Godowsky as Elva Petrovitch
Herschel Mayall as Paul Berkowitz
Toyo Fujita as Count Sakurai
M. Foshida as Baron Saito

References

External links 

 

Films directed by William Worthington
1919 drama films
American black-and-white films
Haworth Pictures Corporation films
American silent feature films
Silent American drama films
1919 films
Film Booking Offices of America films
1910s American films